SQL:2003 is the fourth revision of the SQL database query language. The standard consists of 9 parts which are described in detail in SQL. It was updated by SQL:2006.

New features
The SQL:2003 standard makes minor modifications to all parts of SQL:1999 (also known as SQL3), and officially introduces a few new features such as:
 XML-related features (SQL/XML)
 Window functions
 the sequence generator, which allows standardized sequences
 two new column types: auto-generated values and identity-columns
 the new MERGE statement
 extensions to the CREATE TABLE statement, to allow "CREATE TABLE AS" and "CREATE TABLE LIKE"
 removal of the poorly implemented "BIT" and "BIT VARYING" data types
 OLAP capabilities (initially added in SQL:1999) were extended with a window function.

Documentation availability
The SQL standard is not freely available but may be purchased from ISO or ANSI. A late draft is available as a zip archive from Whitemarsh Information Systems Corporation. The zip archive contains a number of PDF files that define the parts of the SQL:2003 specification.

References

External links
 BNF Grammar for ISO/IEC 9075:2003 – SQL/Framework

 
Declarative programming languages
Query languages